Maurice Stuckey (born 30 May 1990) is a German professional basketball player for Crailsheim Merlins of the Basketball Bundesliga (BBL).

On 23 May 2018, he signed with Brose Bamberg. Stuckey signed with Crailsheim Merlins on 5 December 2019. He averaged 8.9 points per game in 16 games, shooting 41.6% from three-point range. On 10 July 2020, Stuckey re-signed with the team.

International career
In 2016, Stuckey was selected for the German national basketball team.

References

External links
Team Profile
German Basketball Federation Profile
Eurobasket.com Profile

1990 births
Living people
Brose Bamberg players
Crailsheim Merlins players
German men's basketball players
Shooting guards
S.Oliver Würzburg players
Sportspeople from Augsburg